The Wolseley 15/50 was an updated version of the Wolseley 4/44. The main change was the engine; the 4/44 used a pre BMC Morris XPA unit and after the MG TF stopped production it was the only car still fitted with it.  To rationalise production the 15/50 was launched with the BMC B-series engine fitted.  Much of the design was shared with the MG Magnette, although some of the panels of the MG Magnette ZA/ZB (e.g. the boot and rear wings) are not interchangeable with those of the Wolseley 15/50, as stated in Practical Classics.

Unlike the 4/44, the 15/50 had a floor gear change. From 1956 a "Manumatic" two pedal (centrifugal clutch) transmission was an option. This was controlled by a micro switch hidden in the gear lever operating a vacuum servo. Having no synchromesh on bottom gear could make changes into the lowest ratio, which would normally require double declutching, difficult.

The construction was monocoque with independent suspension at the front by coil springs and a live rear axle with semi elliptic leaf springs. The steering was rack and pinion and Lockheed brakes were fitted with  drums all round

In keeping with the up-market positioning of the Wolseley brand the car had upmarket trim with polished walnut dashboard and door cappings and leather seats and a traditional Wolseley radiator grille with illuminated badge. The individual front seats were placed very closely together to allow the car to be used as a six-seater albeit marginal but it was usually sold as a four seater. The handbrake lever was under the dash. A heater was fitted as standard.

Performance
The test car cost £1011 including taxes of £338.

It was replaced in 1958 by the Farina styled Wolseley 15/60.

References

Cars introduced in 1956
15 50
Compact executive cars
Rear-wheel-drive vehicles
Sedans